The CSA Women's Provincial Programme, also known as the CSA Women's Provincial One-Day Tournament, is a women's domestic one-day cricket competition organised by Cricket South Africa. The competition currently sees sixteen provincial teams competing in 50-over matches, and has existed, under various names, since the 1995–96 season.

The most successful side in the history of the competition are Western Province, with eight recorded title wins. The holders are North West, who won the 2021–22 tournament.

History
The tournament began in the 1995–96 as the Women's Inter-Provincial Tournament, with four teams competing: Natal, Northerns, Transvaal and Western Province. The winner is unknown. This was the first women's domestic competition in South Africa since the Simon Trophy ended in 1986–87. The results of the following season's tournament are also unknown. In 1997–98, the tournament was named the Caltrate Inter-Provincial Tournament, and saw an expansion from six to twelve teams. A touring England Under-21s side won the competition. The 1998–99 tournament was won by Northerns, whilst the winners for the next four tournaments are unknown.

Ahead of 2003–04 season, the tournament was renamed the Women's Provincial League, with eleven teams competing: Boland, Border, Eastern Province, Easterns, Free State, Gauteng, Griqualand West, KwaZulu-Natal, Northerns, North West and Western Province, with Boland winning their first title. The following season, Limpopo and Mpumalanga joined the tournament, whilst South Western Districts joined in 2005–06, KwaZulu-Natal Inland in 2006–07 and Kei in 2010–11. Griqualand West was renamed Northern Cape ahead of the 2015–16 season. During this period, Western Province were the most successful team, winning eight titles, including four in a row between 2012–13 and 2015–16.

Ahead of the 2019–20 season, KwaZulu-Natal became KwaZulu-Natal Coastal and Gauteng became Central Gauteng. The end of the season was curtailed due to the COVID-19 pandemic, with North West being declared the winners based on results up until the tournament being cut short. After an initial attempt at the 2020–21 season was also cancelled due to COVID-19, the tournament was renamed the Women's Provincial Programme and went ahead in February 2021, with an altered format. Teams competed in groups based at separate venues, with Western Province and KwaZulu-Natal Coastal winning the two top groups. The 2021–22 edition of the tournament saw a return to its previous format, with North West claiming their fourth title.

Matches in the tournament are played with 50 overs per side, with sixteen teams competing. The tournament has had various formats over the years, but currently has a top tier "Top 6" league, with the winner of the league winning the competition, and two lower Pools, A and B, with promotion and relegation. Teams in the top division play each other twice, whilst teams in the lower pools play each other once.

Teams

Results

See also
 CSA Women's Provincial T20 Competition
 CSA Provincial Competitions

Notes

References

CSA Women's Provincial Programme
South African domestic cricket competitions
Women's cricket competitions in South Africa
Recurring sporting events established in 1995
1995 establishments in South Africa
Limited overs cricket